National Route 70 (N70) forms part of the Philippine highway network. It partially spurs the Asian Highway 26 (AH26) from Palo to Ormoc in Leyte, Philippines.

Route description 
N70 starts at its intersection with Maharlika Highway in Palo, at the vicinity of the Palo Cathedral. It then enters the towns of Santa Fe, Alangalang, Jaro, Tunga, Carigara, Capoocan, and Kananga. It enters the city of Ormoc, where the Asian Highway 26 (AH26) concurrency leaves the highway for the Ormoc Port. It then turns east to follow the western coast of Leyte and traverses the town of Albuera and the city of Baybay before ending at Maharlika Highway in Mahaplag.

Asian Highway Network 
This route partially spurs the Asian Highway 26, running from Palo to Ormoc and continues as a sea ferry to Cebu City.

History
The direct predecessors of N70 are Highway 2 from Palo to Baybay and Highway 1 from Baybay to Mahaplag.

Upon the ratification of the Asian Highway Network by the Philippines in 2007, the highway's segment from Palo to Ormoc was later made part of the Pan-Philippine Highway, particularly its spur in Visayas. The highway network connecting Palo and Mahaplag via the western coast of Leyte was later designated by the Department of Public Works and Highways as N70. The route is signposted from Palo to Ormoc but since the non-AH26 section of the route does not have its own route markers, it is not signposted from Ormoc to Mahaplag.

References

External links 
 Department of Public Works and Highways

Roads in Leyte (province)